Captain Easychord is a July 2001 EP by Stereolab. It was released on CD and 12" vinyl one month prior to the album Sound-Dust. "Moodles" is included on the Japanese version of the Sound-Dust album as a bonus track. The album version of the title track has two musically distinct sections and lasts 5:33; the EP version comprises only the first section, fading out shortly before the transition to the second.

All four tracks were later re-released on the Oscillons from the Anti-Sun compilation.

Track listing
All tracks by Tim Gane and Laetitia Sadier

 "Captain Easychord" – 2:55
 "Long Life Love" – 7:08
 "Canned Candies" – 4:15
 "Moodles" – 7:26

Personnel 

 Stereolab – Engineer, Mixing

References

2001 EPs
Stereolab EPs